The 2010 OFC Women's Championship of women's association football (also known as the OFC Women's Nations Cup) took place in Auckland, New Zealand between 29 September and 8 October. It was the ninth edition of the tournament. For the first time, eight teams participated in the tournament, and a total of sixteen matches were played.

The tournament also served as the OFC Women's World Cup qualification tournament, with the winner qualifying for the 2011 Women's World Cup.

Participating nations

Officials
The following referees were named for the tournament:
 Tupou Patia
 Ravitesh Behari
 Anna-Marie Keighley
 John Saohu
 Averii Jacques

Results

Group stage

Group A

Group B

Knockout stage

Semifinals

Third-place match

Final
New Zealand won the tournament and qualified for the 2011 Women's World Cup.

Awards

Statistics

Goalscorers
12 goals
 Amber Hearn
7 goals

 Sarah Gregorius
 Hannah Wilkinson

6 goals
 Rosie White
5 goals
 Zeen Limbai
4 goals
 Ria Percival
3 goals
 Hayley Moorwood
 Heimiri Alvarez
2 goals

 Regina Mustonen
 Abby Erceg
 Anna Green
 Ali Riley
 Ileen Pegi

1 goal

 Mama Henry
 Teariivahine-Iteuaterai Henry
 Dayna Napa
 Bela Ratubalavu
 Bridgette Armstrong
 Katie Hoyle
 Maia Jackman
 Liz Milne
 Kirsty Yallop
 Rumona Morris
 Samantha Peninsa
 Deslyn Siniu
 Betty Maenu'u
 Ella Misibini
 Mesalyn Saepio
 Tihani Tokoragi
 Tiare White
 Vasi Feke
 Fololeni Siale
 Stephanie Tougen

Own goal
 Lupe Likiliki (playing against Papua New Guinea)

Final ranking

|-
|colspan="10"|Eliminated in the Group Stage
|-

External links
 OFC Site

References

women
2010
OFC
2010
OFC
2010 in New Zealand women's sport
September 2010 sports events in New Zealand
October 2010 sports events in New Zealand
Association football in Auckland